Patriarch Maximus I or Patriarch Maximos I may refer to:

 Maximus I of Antioch, Archbishop of Antioch in 182–191
 Maximus I of Constantinople, Archbishop of Constantinople in 380

See also
 Patriarch (disambiguation)
 Maximus (disambiguation)
 Patriarch Maximus II (disambiguation)